Frank Crüsemann (born 9 July 1938 in Bremen) is a German Old Testament scholar, biblical critic, and emeritus professor at Bethel Church College from 1980 to 2004. He is known for his publications on the Torah, Elijah and the social history of the Old Testament, and his participation in Christian–Jewish reconciliation and the German Evangelical Church Assembly.

Biography 
Crüsemann was born in Bremen in 1938 to Gustav and Jutta Crüsemann. He has been married in a second marriage to Marlene Crüsemann, a New Testament student, since 1982, and has a daughter, Nicola Crüsemann (from her first marriage), and a son.

Crüsemann was a member of the Christian Peace Conference and participant in the 1st and 2nd All-Christian Peace Meetings in Prague in 1961 and 1964, respectively.

On 31 October 2008 (Reformation Day), alongside Ulrich Duchrow, Heino Falcke, Christian Felber, Kuno Füssel, Detlef Hensche, Siegfried Katterle, Arne Manzeschke, Silke Niemeyer, Franz Segbers, Ton Veerkamp and Karl Georg Zinn, he was the first of Aufrufs Frieden mit dem Kapital? Ein Aufruf wider die Anpassung der Evangelischen Kirche an die Macht der Wirtschaft (Calling peace with capital? A call against the adjustment of the Evangelical Church to the power of the economy).

Contributions 
Crüsemann studies Christian practices in dealing with the Old Testament in the New Testament. He demonstrates that the view of the New Testament and thus also of Jesus is shaped by dogmatic developments, some of which obscure the view of biblical texts and do not allow certain perspectives. He shows that in all New Testament writings the "Old Testament" is recognized as a given "holy scripture" and has authority.

According to Besprochen von Thomas Kroll, "Frank Crüsemann is now trying a new approach by interpreting the relationship between the two parts from himself and thus offering a completely new perspective on Christianity and Judaism."

Bibliography

Books

Articles

References 

1938 births
Living people
Writers from Bremen
Old Testament scholars
20th-century Protestant theologians
21st-century Protestant theologians
Christian Peace Conference members